Use Your Illusion I is the third studio album by American hard rock band Guns N' Roses, released on September 17, 1991, the same day as its counterpart Use Your Illusion II. Both albums were released in conjunction with the Use Your Illusion Tour. The album debuted at No. 2 on the Billboard charts, selling 685,000 copies in its first week, behind Use Your Illusion IIs first-week sales of 770,000. Use Your Illusion I has sold 5,502,000 units in the United States as of 2010, according to Nielsen SoundScan. Each of the Use Your Illusion albums have been certified 7× Platinum by the RIAA. It was nominated for a Grammy Award in 1992. This is their first album to feature former The Cult drummer Matt Sorum, who replaced Steven Adler following Adler's departure in 1990 (although he was featured again on "Civil War", which appeared on its counterpart album), as well as keyboardist Dizzy Reed. This is their first album to be recorded as a six-piece band.

Background
The Use Your Illusion albums represent a turning point in the sound of Guns N' Roses. Although the band did not abandon the aggressive hard-rock sound it had become known for with 1987's Appetite for Destruction, Use Your Illusion I demonstrated a more diverse sound, incorporating elements of blues, classical music, heavy metal, punk rock, and classic rock and roll. This is exemplified by the use of piano on several tracks by singer Axl Rose and keyboardist Dizzy Reed, as well as on Use Your Illusion II. Use Your Illusion I contains two of the three songs, "November Rain" and "Don't Cry", whose videos are considered a trilogy. The third song, "Estranged", is on Use Your Illusion II.

Another factor in the different sound compared to the band's earlier work is the addition of former The Cult drummer Matt Sorum, who replaced Steven Adler. Adler was fired from the group due to heroin addiction. Guitarist Izzy Stradlin said: "Adler's sense of swing was the push and pull that give the songs their feel. When that was gone, it was just... unbelievable, weird. Nothing worked. I would have preferred to continue with Steve, but we'd had two years off and we couldn't wait any longer."

A number of songs on the album were written in the band's early days and can be found on a popular bootleg album of early demo tapes known as "The Rumbo Tapes". "Back Off Bitch", "Bad Obsession", "Don't Cry" (referred to by Rose during the ensuing tour as 'the first song we ever wrote together'), "November Rain" and "The Garden" are considered part of this group. There is also a cover of Paul McCartney and Wings' "Live and Let Die".

Besides the stylistic differences, another new aspect in Use Your Illusion I was longer songs. "November Rain", an epic ballad, is nearly nine minutes long, and "Coma" is more than 10 minutes. Another change was the presence of tracks sung by other members of the band (even though certain songs from Appetite for Destruction and G N' R Lies featured other members on duet vocals): lead vocals on "Dust N' Bones", "You Ain't the First" and "Double Talkin' Jive" are performed by rhythm guitarist Izzy Stradlin. In addition, "14 Years" and "So Fine" from Use Your Illusion II were sung by Izzy Stradlin and Duff McKagan, respectively.

The band had some difficulty achieving the final sound, especially during the mixing stages of both albums. According to a 1991 Rolling Stone cover story, after mixing 21 tracks with engineer/producer Bob Clearmountain, the band decided to scrap the mixes and start from scratch with engineer Bill Price of Sex Pistols fame. "If Axl liked the mix, Slash didn't", Price recalled, "and if Slash liked it, Axl didn't… They still hadn't finished the record when their massive 18-month world tour started, so the last half-dozen songs were recorded in random studios across America on days off between gigs."

Slash has stated that a great deal of the material for the album was written on acoustic guitars in a couple of nights at his house (the Walnut House), after several months of non-productivity.

Songs
"Right Next Door to Hell" is a product of discord between Axl and his West Hollywood high-rise neighbor, Gabriella Kantor. Kantor had Rose arrested and sued Rose, claiming he hit her with a wine bottle. He denied the charges and labeled her a "fanatical fan". The condo was eventually given away in MTV's "Evict Axl" contest. Timo Caltia (real name Timo Kaltio), who participated in the writing of this song, is a Finnish guitarist, songwriter and guitar tech who once worked with Hanoi Rocks. He'd played a chorus riff of the song at his home while Stradlin was visiting.

"Live and Let Die" was released as the second single from the Use Your Illusion I album and the fourth out of all the Use Your Illusion singles. A music video was made in November 1991 featuring the band playing live on stage and showing old pictures. The video was also made shortly before Stradlin's departure and it was the last video where he appears. It charted at number 20 on the Mainstream rock chart. The song was nominated for Best Hard Rock Performance during the 1993 Grammy Awards.

"Don't Cry" is a power ballad and two versions were released simultaneously on different albums. The version with the original lyrics is featured on Use Your Illusion I, while the version with alternate lyrics is the 13th track on Use Your Illusion II. Only the vocal tracks differ, and even then only in the verses; however, in those verses, not only are the words entirely different, but the meter and melody are also slightly different. There is also a third version, officially released only on the single for the song, which was recorded during the Appetite for Destruction sessions in 1986. Rose has stated that the song was written about a girl named Monique Lewis (the face tattooed on his right bicep). She was romantically involved with both Rose and Stradlin at different times.

"Bad Obsession" is about tackling drug abuse and addiction, which had haunted the band since before they had become famous. Michael Monroe, lead singer of the Finnish hard rock band Hanoi Rocks and a big influence on Guns N' Roses, plays the harmonica and tenor saxophone on the studio version. A live version from the Tokyo Dome was featured on the Use Your Illusion I DVD as song number six and Rose takes a dig at Stradlin by saying "This a song that we wrote about one year before "Mr. Brownstone" with the help of our friend West Arkeen and some guy that just, I don't know, his name just escapes me", referencing Stradlin.

"Back Off Bitch" was written before the band's 1987 debut album, Appetite for Destruction. The song was also played during Guns N' Roses concerts before the release of Appetite for Destruction. "Back Off Bitch" was written partially about Rose's girlfriend, Gina Siler, who moved with him to Los Angeles in 1982, and eventually kicked him out in 1983, due to his anger issues. It was also demoed several times by the band during this period.

At the end of "Double Talkin' Jive" Slash performs an extended flamenco-style guitar solo. Live performances of this song were stretched from its original three-minute length to more than eight minutes long. The opening line of the song "Found a head and an arm in a garbage can" refers to body parts that were actually discovered by the police in a dumpster in the vicinity of the studio. It is rumored that the body parts found were of porn actor/director/writer Billy London aka William Arnold Newton.

"November Rain" is an epic ballad written by lead singer Axl Rose and released as a single in June 1992. It features a sweeping orchestral backing and is one of Guns N' Roses' longest songs. It was the longest song in history to enter the top 10 of the U.S. Billboard Hot 100, until it was surpassed by "All Too Well" by Taylor Swift, which reached number one in 2021. Guns N' Roses performed this song with Elton John on piano at the 1992 MTV Video Music Awards.

"Garden of Eden" was written while the band was rehearsing for an extended period of time in Chicago. There is a music video of the song, filmed in one static take (shot through a fish eye lens) which features a close-up of Rose singing into a ribbon microphone with the band playing behind him, whilst keyboardists Dizzy Reed and Teddy Andreadis (who played the harmonica for the band during the Use Your Illusion Tour) are seen dancing in the far background. There are two versions of the video, both made in 1992. One version has strips of paper flying through the air, and is mostly found on music video sites like Yahoo! Music. The other version has lyrics onscreen, complete with a "follow-the-bouncing-ball", but with no paper flying around. This is the version that is on the Guns N' Roses music video compilation Welcome to the Videos.

"Dead Horse" starts with an acoustic section, which features a guitar riff written by Rose. The electric guitars soon come in for the heavier section which dominates the song. After the final climactic chorus, the opening section is reprised before ending with an audio effect of the song being fast-forwarded.

"Coma" was written by Rose and Slash about their drug overdoses. It is Guns N' Roses longest song to date. It features hospital sound effects and a real defibrillator.

Artwork

Both albums' covers are the work of Estonian-American artist Mark Kostabi. They consist of detail from Raphael's painting The School of Athens. The highlighted figure, unlike many of those in the painting, has not been identified with any specific philosopher. The only difference in the artwork between the albums is the color scheme used for each album. Use Your Illusion I uses yellow and red. The original painting was titled by Paul Kostabi as Use Your Illusion and also became the title of both albums. Both Use Your Illusion albums' liner notes include the message "Fuck You, St. Louis!" amongst the thank you notes, a reference to the Riverport Riot near there at the Hollywood Casino Amphitheatre in July 1991 during the Use Your Illusion Tour.

Release and reception

Released at midnight on September 17, 1991, the Use Your Illusion albums were among the most anticipated in rock history. Predictions in the industry were of sales reaching the likes of Michael Jackson's Thriller and Bruce Springsteen's Born in the U.S.A., this despite the fact that major stores K-Mart and Walmart refused to stock the albums due to the profanity present. Estimates suggested that over 500,000 copies of the two albums were sold in just 2 hours. Both albums ultimately underperformed expectations domestically but were still commercially successful, with Use Your Illusion I selling 5,502,000 and both being certified 7× Platinum by the RIAA. Use Your Illusion I debuted below Use Your Illusion II mainly due to the fact that the second album contained the main lead single of the two albums "You Could Be Mine".

Reception to Use Your Illusion I was mainly positive, and it is regarded as the heavier-sounding album of the two due in part to the influence of Izzy Stradlin. Critics praised the highlights of the album such as "November Rain" and "Coma", the closing track, but criticized the amount of filler on the album. Asked if the wait was worth it, David Fricke of Rolling Stone said "yes". Rolling Stone listed the album at number 41 in their list "100 Best Albums of the 90s".

Track listing

Personnel

Guns N' Roses
W. Axl Rose – lead vocals, piano, choir, synthesizer, programming, backing vocals, acoustic guitar, sound effects
Slash – lead guitar, rhythm guitar, slide guitar, acoustic guitar, dobro, classical guitar, talkbox, six-string bass, backing vocals
Izzy Stradlin – rhythm guitar, backing vocals, choir, acoustic guitar, lead guitar, lead vocals on "Dust N' Bones", "You Ain't the First" and "Double Talkin' Jive", percussion on "Bad Obsession"  
Duff McKagan – bass, backing vocals, acoustic guitar, choir
Matt Sorum – drums, percussion, backing vocals, choir
Dizzy Reed – keyboard, backing vocals
Additional musicians

Shannon Hoon – backing vocals on "Live and Let Die", "November Rain", "You Ain't the First", and "The Garden"; co-lead vocals on "Don't Cry"
Johann Langlie – programming on "Live and Let Die", "November Rain" and "Garden of Eden"; sound effects on "Coma"
Michael Monroe – harmonica and saxophone on "Bad Obsession"

Reba Shaw – backing vocals on "November Rain"
Stuart Bailey – backing vocals on "November Rain"
Jon Thautwein – horn on "Live and Let Die"
Matthew McKagan – horn on "Live and Let Die"
Rachel West – horn on "Live and Let Die"

Robert Clark – horn on "Live and Let Die"
Tim Doyle – tambourine on "You Ain't the First"
Alice Cooper – co-lead vocals on "The Garden"
West Arkeen – acoustic guitar on "The Garden"
Bruce Foster – sound effects on "Coma"

Production and design

Mike Clink – production, engineering, nutcracker on "Dead Horse"
Jim Mitchell – additional engineering
Bill Price – mixing
George Marino – mastering
Kevin Reagan – art direction, graphic design
Mark Kostabi – album artwork
Robert John – photography

Allen Abrahamson – assistant engineer
Buzz Burrowes – assistant engineer
Chris Puram – assistant engineer
Craig Portelis – assistant engineer
Ed Goodreau – assistant engineer
Jason Roberts – assistant engineer
John Aguto – assistant engineer

L. Stu Young – assistant engineer
Leon Granados – assistant engineer
Mike Douglass – assistant engineer
Talley Sherwood – assistant engineer

Charts

Weekly charts

Year-end charts

Decade-end charts

Certifications

See also
List of glam metal albums and songs

References

1991 albums
Guns N' Roses albums
Geffen Records albums
Albums produced by Mike Clink
Albums recorded at Metalworks Studios
Albums recorded at Record Plant (Los Angeles)